Juliet Awwad or Juliet Nickogos Yacoub Hacobian (born July 7, 1951 in Amman, Jordan) is a Jordanian actress and director of Armenian descent. She is recognized as one of the most famous Jordanian drama actresses.

Career 
Awwad was born in Amman, and earned her Bachelor's Degree in Acting and Directing in Russia in 1972, and a Higher Diploma in Children Theater. Al-Gha'eb was her debut in the theater in 1974, and in the next year, she participated in her first TV series Ras Al-Ain. She also worked as a director in children theater in Culture and Arts Authority from 1972 to 1978 with her husband Jameel Awwad.

Filmography

Television

Films

References

External links
 Juliet Awwad at elcinema.com

1951 births
Living people
People from Amman
Jordanian actresses
Jordanian people of Armenian descent
Jordanian Christians